Grantola is a comune (municipality) in the Province of Varese in the Italian region Lombardy, located about  northwest of Milan and about  north of Varese.

The municipality of Grantola contains the frazioni (subdivisions, mainly villages and hamlets) Bellaria, Motta, Montebello, and Vicema.

Grantola borders the following municipalities: Cassano Valcuvia, Cugliate-Fabiasco, Cunardo, Ferrera di Varese, Mesenzana, Montegrino Valtravaglia.

References

Cities and towns in Lombardy